Thornton Carle Fry (7 January 1892, Findlay, Ohio – 1 January 1991) was an applied mathematician, known for his two widely-used textbooks, Probability and its engineering uses (1928) and Elementary differential equations (1929).

Career 
Thornton C. Fry received his bachelor's degree from Findlay College in 1912 and then pursued graduate study in Wisconsin in mathematics, physics, and astronomy. He received his M.A. in 1913 and his Ph.D. in 1920 in applied mathematics from the University of Wisconsin-Madison with thesis under the supervision of Charles S. Slichter.

Fry was employed as an industrial mathematician by Western Electric Company from 1916 to 1924 and then by Bell Telephone Laboratories (Bell Labs), which was half-owned by Western Electric. He headed a corporate division for industrial applications of mathematics and statistics and was involved in research and development for the U.S. federal government in both world wars.

After retiring (due to reaching the mandatory retirement age) from Bell Labs, he worked as a consultant with Boeing Scientific Research Labs and also, during the 1960s, with Walter Orr Roberts, director of the National Center for Atmospheric Research.

In 1924 Fry was an Invited Speaker of the International Congress of Mathematicians in Toronto. In 1982 the Mathematical Association of America (MAA) gave him the MAA's distinguished service award.

Selected publications

with R. V. L. Hartley: 
with R. V. L. Hartley: 

with John R. Carson:

Patents
"System for determining the direction of propagation of wave energy." U.S. Patent 1,502,243, issued July 22, 1924.
"Harmonic analyzer." U.S. Patent 1,503,824, issued August 5, 1924.
"Filtering circuit." U.S. Patent 1,559,864, issued November 3, 1925.

References

1892 births
1991 deaths
People from Findlay, Ohio
20th-century American mathematicians
Scientists at Bell Labs
University of Findlay alumni
University of Wisconsin–Madison College of Letters and Science alumni
Fellows of the American Physical Society